Corporate pathos is public relations jargon for the employment of emotional engagement techniques to help alter adverse public attitudes to a corporation. 

In general, pathos refers to the use of an emotional appeal. The term "corporate pathos" describes the use of emotional arguments alongside rational explanations for organizations to convince audiences of their given position. The corporate pathos technique is used by businesses facing a crisis and an angry public.

References

Public relations terminology